Aleucis is a genus of moths in the family Geometridae.

Selected species

Aleucis distinctata (Herrich-Schäffer, [1839]) - sloe carpet
Aleucis orientalis

Baptini
Geometridae genera